Saleh Youssef Fathy (born ) is a former Egyptian male volleyball player. He was part of the Egypt men's national volleyball team at the 2008 Summer Olympics. On club level he played for Zamalek. He is an outside hitter and is 194 cm tall.

Clubs
Current –  Esperance
Debut –  Zamalek

References

External links
 FIVB profile

1982 births
Living people
Egyptian men's volleyball players
Volleyball players at the 2008 Summer Olympics
Olympic volleyball players of Egypt